Chaudhry Arshad Javaid Warraich is a Pakistani politician who had been a Member of the Provincial Assembly of the Punjab from August 2018 till January 2023. Previously he was a member of the Punjab Assembly from May 2013 to May 2018.

Early life 
He was born on 13 December 1956.

Political career
He was elected to the Provincial Assembly of the Punjab as a candidate of Pakistan Muslim League (N) (PML-N) from Constituency PP-131 (Sialkot-XI) in 2013 Pakistani general election.

He was re-elected to Provincial Assembly of the Punjab as a candidate of PML-N from Constituency PP-44 (Sialkot-X) in 2018 Pakistani general election.

References

Living people
Punjab MPAs 2013–2018
1956 births
Pakistan Muslim League (N) MPAs (Punjab)
Punjab MPAs 2018–2023